Emory University is a private research university in Atlanta, Georgia. Founded in 1836 as Emory College by the Methodist Episcopal Church and named in honor of Methodist bishop John Emory, Emory is the second-oldest private institution of higher education in Georgia.

Emory University has nine academic divisions: Emory College of Arts and Sciences, Oxford College, Goizueta Business School, Laney Graduate School, School of Law, School of Medicine, Nell Hodgson Woodruff School of Nursing, Rollins School of Public Health, and the Candler School of Theology. Emory University, the Georgia Institute of Technology, and Peking University in Beijing, China jointly administer the Wallace H. Coulter Department of Biomedical Engineering. The university operates the Confucius Institute in Atlanta in partnership with Nanjing University. Emory has a growing faculty research partnership with the Korea Advanced Institute of Science and Technology (KAIST). Emory University students come from all 50 states, the District of Columbia, five territories of the United States, and over 100 foreign countries.

Emory Healthcare is the largest healthcare system in the state of Georgia and comprises seven major hospitals, including the Emory University Hospital and Emory University Hospital Midtown. The university operates the Winship Cancer Institute, Yerkes National Primate Research Center, and many disease and vaccine research centers. Emory University is the leading coordinator of the U.S. Health Department's National Ebola Training and Education Center. The university is one of four institutions involved in the NIAID's Tuberculosis Research Units Program. The International Association of National Public Health Institutes is headquartered at the university and the Centers for Disease Control and Prevention and the American Cancer Society are national affiliate institutions located adjacent to the campus. The university is partnered with the Carter Center.

Emory University has the 15th-largest endowment among U.S. colleges and universities. The university is classified among "R1: Doctoral Universities – Very high research activity" and is cited for high scientific performance and citation impact in the CWTS Leiden Ranking. The National Science Foundation ranked the university 36th among academic institutions in the United States for research and development (R&D) expenditures. In 1995 Emory University was elected to the Association of American Universities, an association of the 65 leading research universities in the United States and Canada.

Emory faculty and alumni include 2 Prime Ministers, 9 university presidents, 11 members of the United States Congress, 2 Nobel Peace Prize laureates, a Vice President of the United States, a United States Speaker of the House, and a United States Supreme Court Justice. Other notable alumni include 21 Rhodes Scholars and 6 Pulitzer Prize winners, as well as Emmy Award winners, MacArthur Fellows, CEOs of Fortune 500 companies, heads of state and other leaders in foreign government. Emory has more than 149,000 alumni, with 75 alumni clubs established worldwide in 20 countries.

History

Nineteenth century
Emory College was founded in 1836 in Oxford, Georgia by the Methodist Episcopal Church. The college was named in honor of the departed Methodist bishop John Emory. Ignatius Alphonso Few was the college's first president. In 1854, the Atlanta Medical College, a forerunner of Emory University School of Medicine, was founded. On April 12, 1861, the American Civil War began. Emory College was closed in November 1861 and all of its students enlisted on the Confederate side. In late 1863 the war came to Georgia and the college was used as hospital and later a headquarters for the Union Army. The university produced many officers who served in the war, including General George Thomas Anderson (1846C) who fought in nearly every major battle in the eastern theater. Thirty-five Emory students lost their lives and much of the campus was destroyed during the war.

Emory College, as with the entire Southeastern United States, struggled to overcome financial devastation during the Reconstruction Era. In 1880, Atticus Greene Haygood, Emory College President, delivered a speech expressing gratitude for the end of slavery in the United States, which captured the attention of George I. Seney, a New York banker. Seney gave Emory College $5,000 to repay its debts, $50,000 for construction, and $75,000 to establish a new endowment. In the 1880s, the technology department was launched by Isaac Stiles Hopkins, a polymath professor at Emory College. Hopkins became the first president of the Georgia Institute of Technology in 1888. Emory University's first international student, Yun Chi-ho, graduated in 1893. Yun became an important political activist in Korea and is the author of "Aegukga", the national anthem of the Republic of Korea.

Twentieth century
On August 16, 1906, the Wesley Memorial Hospital and Training School for Nurses, later renamed the Nell Hodgson Woodruff School of Nursing, was established. In 1914, the Candler School of Theology was established. In 1915, Emory College relocated to Druid Hills and was rechartered as Emory University after accepting a land grant from Asa Griggs Candler, founder of The Coca-Cola Company and brother of commissioned chair Warren Akin Candler. The Emory University School of Law was established in 1916. From the 1920s through the 1970s, Emory University established its reputation as a regional institution that offered a solid education in medicine, law, theology, business, and the liberal arts.

First and Second World Wars
On April 6, 1917, the United States entered the First World War. Emory University organized a medical unit, composed of medical school faculty and medical alumni, that would be known as Emory Unit, Base Hospital 43. The unit served in Loir-et-Cher, France from July 1918 to January 1919. The Emory Unit, Base Hospital 43 was remobilized during the Second World War and served in the North African campaign and Europe. To recognize Emory's participation in the war effort, a ship was christened M.S. Emory Victory and served through World War II and in the Korean War.

In the 1940s, Emory University students, alumni, and faculty served in the Asia-Pacific War and European theater of World War II. Lieutenant Commander James L. Starnes, a graduate of Emory Law, was the navigator of the battleship  and served as officer of the deck during the signing of the Japanese Instrument of Surrender. Bobby Jones, the golfer, served during the Battle of Normandy. Dr. Alfred A. Weinstein, a professor of surgery at Emory University School of Medicine, was a prisoner of war of the Empire of Japan between 1942 and 1945. His memoir, "Barbed Wire Surgeon", is considered one of the finest accounts concerning allied prisoners under Japanese captivity and highlights the abuses of the war criminal Mutsuhiro Watanabe. Kiyoshi Tanimoto, who graduated from the Candler School of Theology in 1940 and is portrayed in John Hersey's Hiroshima, was able to organize the Hiroshima Maidens reconstructive surgery program based on the associations he made while studying in the United States. Tatsumasa Shirakawa, a Japanese student at the Candler School of Theology, was placed under arrest temporarily until Dean Henry Burton Trimble negotiated his release. Emory helped the nation prepare for war by participating in the V-12 Navy College Training Program and Army Specialized Training Program, programs designed to supplement the force of commissioned officers in the United States Navy and United States Army. The Candler School of Theology trained men for military chaplaincy. During the war, university enrollment boasted two military students for every one civilian. Emory University alumni would go on to serve in the Korean War, Second Indochina War (Vietnam War), Persian Gulf War, Yugoslav Wars, and the Global War on Terrorism.

Women's and civil rights movements
The women's movement and civil rights movement during the 1950s and 1960s in the United States profoundly shaped the future of Emory University. Formerly an all-male school, Emory officially became a coeducational institution in 1953. Although it had previously admitted women under limited circumstances, the university had never before had a policy through which they could enroll in large numbers and as resident students. In 1959, sororities first appeared on campus. In 1962, in the midst of the civil rights movement, Emory embraced the initiative to end racial restrictions when it asked the courts to declare portions of the Georgia statutes unconstitutional. Previously, Georgia law denied tax-exempt status to private universities with racially integrated student bodies. The Supreme Court of Georgia ruled in Emory's favor and Emory officially became racially integrated. Marvin S. Arrington Sr. was Emory University's first, full-time African American student and graduated from Emory University School of Law in 1967.

In 1971, Emory established one of the nation's first African-American studies programs and the first of its kind in the Southeastern United States. Emory's diversity and academic reputation continued to flourish under the leadership of the university's fifth president, James T. Laney. In addition to leading universities in the Southeastern United States in the promotion of racial equality, Laney and many of the school's faculty and administrators were outspoken advocates of global human rights and thus were openly opposed to the military dictatorship in South Korea (1961–1987). On March 30, 1983, Laney's friend Kim Dae-jung, while in political exile in the United States, presented a speech on human rights and democracy at Emory University and accepted an honorary Doctor of Laws degree. Kim would go on to play a major role in ending authoritarianism in South Korea, served as the eighth President of South Korea from 1998 to 2003, and was awarded the Nobel Peace Prize in 2000 for his successful implementation of the Sunshine Policy. Laney would later serve as United States Ambassador to South Korea and the Emory graduate school, founded in 1919, was named in his honor in 2009.

In 2005, the university presented the President Medal, a rare award conferred only on individuals whose impact on the world has enhanced the dominion of peace or has enlarged the range of cultural achievement, to Civil Rights Movement activist Rosa Parks. The award is one of the highest honors presented by Emory.

In 2014, at Emory's 169th Commencement, John Lewis, the only living "Big Six" leader of the civil rights movement, delivered the keynote address and received an honorary doctor of laws degree. In 2015, Emory University School of Law received a $1.5 million donation to help establish a John Lewis Chair in Civil Rights and Social Justice. The gift, given anonymously, funds a professorship which will enable Emory Law to conduct a national search for a scholar with an established academic profile of distinction and a demonstrated desire to promote the rule of law through the study of civil rights. The law school has committed to raise an additional $500,000 to fund the chair fully.

Expansion and modernization
The course of Emory's history changed dramatically in November 1979 when Robert Winship Woodruff and George Waldo Woodruff presented the institution with a gift of $105 million in Coca-Cola stock. At the time this was the largest single gift to any institution of higher education in American history.

Twenty-first century

The latest additions to the Atlanta Campus include buildings for cancer research, biomedical research, scientific computation, mathematics and science, vaccine research, and the performing arts.

Prior to 2018 the campus was in an unincorporated area, statistically counted in the Druid Hills census-designated place. In 2016 the university stated that it intended to petition to be annexed into the City of Atlanta; in 2017 the university leadership formally submitted its petition. The City of Atlanta annexed Emory's campus effective January 1, 2018, a part of its largest annexation within a period of 65 years; the Atlanta City Council voted to do so the prior December.

Gregory L. Fenves, formerly the president of the University of Texas at Austin, became Emory University's twenty-first president in August 2020.

Academics

Admissions statistics

Emory University is considered highly selective. The Median SAT score of the class of 2023 was 1500 and Median ACT score was 34. In 2022, Emory University received 33,517 applications and had a 9% regular decision admission rate and a 10.6% overall admission rate. The enrolling class was 55.4% female, 44.6% male and 10.4% of enrolling class identify as first-generation college students. 59 unique languages were spoken in the enrolling first year class and 40 countries were represented.

Undergraduate schools

 Emory College of Arts and Sciences (1836)
The Emory College of Arts and Sciences offers the Bachelor of Arts (B.A.) and the Bachelor of Science (B.S) undergraduate academic degrees. Academic Departments include African American Studies, African Studies, American Studies, Ancient Mediterranean Studies, Anthropology, Art History, Biology, Chemistry, Classics, Comparative Literature, Computer Science, East Asian Studies, Economics, English, Environmental Sciences, Film & Media Studies, French and Italian Studies, German Studies, Global Health, Culture, and Society, History, Human Health, Interdisciplinary Studies, Jewish Studies, Latin American and Caribbean Studies, Linguistics, Mathematics, Middle Eastern and South Asian Studies, Music, Neuroscience and Behavioral Biology, Philosophy, Physics, Political Science, Psychology, Quantitative Theory and Methods, Religion, Russian and East Asian Languages and Cultures, Sociology, Spanish and Portuguese, Theater and Dance, and Women's, Gender and Sexuality Studies. The Confucius Institute, a non-profit public institution affiliated with the Ministry of Education of the People's Republic of China, operates in co-operation with the university at the Emory College of Arts and Sciences. The Emory-Tibet Partnership was established in 1998.

Emory University offers highly selective honors programs for high-performing undergraduates in most areas of concentration. More than 25% of undergraduates participate in an honors program each year.

Emory University offers a five-year dual degree program in engineering, in collaboration with the Georgia Institute of Technology. Emory University also offers a dual master's degree in social work with the University of Georgia.

 Oxford College (1836)

Oxford College offers an Associate degree (A.A.) in liberal arts. Students who successfully complete Oxford College advance to Emory College of Arts and Sciences to complete their undergraduate education. Academic departments include Anthropology, Art, Biology, Chemistry, Economics, English, Geology, History, Languages, Mathematics & Computer Science, Music, Political Science, Philosophy, Psychology, Physics & Astronomy, Quantitative Theory and Methods, Religion, Sociology, Theater, and Women's Studies.

Graduate and professional schools

Emory University School of Medicine (1854)
The Emory University School of Medicine offers the Doctor of Medicine (MD), Doctor of Physical Therapy, and Master of Medical Science degrees. Academic departments include Biochemistry, Biomedical Engineering, Biomedical Informatics, Cell Biology, Human Genetics, Microbiology/Immunology, Pharmacology, and Physiology. Clinical Science Departments include Anesthesiology, Dermatology, Emergency Medicine, Family & Preventive Medicine, Gynecology/Obstetrics, Hematology/Medical Oncology, Medicine (including divisions of Cardiology; Digestive Diseases; Endocrinology, Metabolism, and Lipids; General Internal Medicine; Geriatrics and Gerontology; Hospital Medicine; Infectious Diseases; Pulmonary, Allergy, Critical Care, and Sleep Medicine; Renal Medicine; and Rheumatology), Neurology, Neurosurgery, Ophthalmology, Orthopaedics, Otolaryngology, Pathology, Pediatrics, Psychiatry & Behavioral Sciences, Radiation Oncology, Radiology, Rehabilitation Medicine, Surgery, and Urology.

Nell Hodgson Woodruff School of Nursing (1905)
The Nell Hodgson Woodruff School of Nursing offers the Bachelor of Science in Nursing (BSN), Masters of Science in Nursing, and Doctor of Nursing Practice (DNP).

Candler School of Theology (1914)
The Candler School of Theology offers the Master of Divinity (M.Div.), Master of Religious Leadership (MRL), Master of Religion and Public Life (MRPL), Master of Theological Studies (MTS), Master of Theology (Th.M.), Doctor of Theology in Pastoral Counseling (Th.D.), and Doctor of Ministry (D.Min.), an online degree.

Emory University School of Law (1916)
The Emory University School of Law offers the Juris Doctor, Juris Master, Master of Laws, and Doctor of Juridical Science.

Laney Graduate School (1919)
The Laney Graduate School offers the Doctor of Philosophy and Master of Arts degrees.

Goizueta Business School (1919)
The Goizueta Business School offers the Bachelor of Business Administration, Master of Business Administration, Executive Master of Business Administration, and a Doctor of Philosophy in Business Administration.

Rollins School of Public Health (1990)
The Rollins School of Public Health offers the Master of Public Health (MPH) and Master of Science in Public Health (MSPH) and Doctor of Philosophy (PhD) degrees. Academic Departments include Behavioral Sciences & Health Education, Biostatistics & Bioinformatics, Environmental Health, Epidemiology, Global Health, and Health Policy & Management.

Library system

Emory University is a member of the Association of Research Libraries. The Emory University library system includes over 3.9 million print and electronic volumes and 83,000-plus electronic journals. Emory University libraries include the Robert W. Woodruff Library, Woodruff Health Sciences Center Library, Hugh F. MacMillan and Yuddhishtir Modhwadia Law Library, James S. Guy Chemistry Library, Pitts Theology Library, Goizueta Business Library, Marian K. Heilbrun Music & Media Library, and the Stuart A. Rose Manuscript, Archives, and Rare Book Library (The Rose Library). The Rose Library contains rare materials relating to literature, African American history and culture, and Southern and Georgia history. Notable pieces of the collection include a rare first edition of Robinson Crusoe by Daniel Defoe, as well as papers of Flannery O'Connor, Alice Walker, Langston Hughes, Salman Rushdie, W.B. Yeats, Medbh McGuckian, Seamus Heaney, and Ted Hughes.

Subject specialist librarians provided research assistance for every academic department at the university. The Annual Robert W. Woodruff Library Undergraduate Research Award recognizes undergraduate students who make extensive use of Woodruff Library's collections and research resources in their original scholarship and show evidence of critical analysis in their research skills.

In 2012, the Princeton Review ranked the Robert W. Woodruff Library among the top 10 "Best College Libraries" in the United States. In 2013, the Pitts Theology Library of the Candler School of Theology was named as one of "Most Beautiful College Libraries in the World".

Rankings and reputation

Emory University is ranked 22nd among national universities in the United States and 71st among global universities by U.S. News & World Report, 98th among global universities and 19th in the United States in the Times Higher Education World University Rankings for 2017–18. QS University Rankings listed Emory as 27th in the United States. The university has been named both a Hidden Ivy and a "New Ivy". The university was ranked 17th among colleges and universities in the United States in a The Wall Street Journal survey. 

The Princeton Review named the Emory University School of Law as one of the best 169 law schools in the U.S. in 2014. Bloomberg Businessweek ranked Goizueta Business School's BBA Program ninth in the nation in 2014. The Economist ranked Goizueta Business School's MBA program 27th in the nation in 2019.

In 2012, following an internal investigation led by Emory Provost Earl Lewis and Jones Day Law Firm, Emory University announced that members of Emory University's Office of Admission and Institutional Research intentionally misreported data concerning entering students' standardized test scores and class rankings between 2000 and 2012 to standard reference sources and third parties who rank colleges and universities. For example, while the office reported that 89% of its students graduated in the top 10% of their class, only 75% actually had. Following the investigation, the individuals responsible for the misreportings were fired or resigned and the university issued a public apology. The university made several corrective actions in 2012 and 2013, including the hiring of independent data advisers, to ensure accurate data collection and reporting in the future.

Research

Facilities and partnerships

Emory University is classified among "R1: Doctoral Universities – Very high research activity". In 2021, Emory received $894.7 million from external funding agencies. Emory University leads the nation in the number of students with Kirschstein-National Research Service Award pre-doctoral fellowships from the National Institutes of Health.

Emory University has a strong partnership with the Centers for Disease Control and Prevention (CDC). In 1947, the university donated 15 acres of land to the United States Department of Health and Human Services for the construction of the CDC headquarters. The Emory University Prevention Research Center (EPRC) and Emory Center for Injury Control are funded by the CDC. Emory University's African Center of Excellence for Public Health Security, which seeks to improve preparedness and response to health threats in low-income countries, is a five-year, multimillion-dollar cooperative program with the CDC and International Association of National Public Health Institutes (IANPHI). The Emory University Center for Global Safe Water (CGSW), which conducts applied research, evaluation, and training to promote global health equity through universal access to safe water, sanitation, and hygiene, works in collaboration with the CDC. The Emory University Global Health Institute, funded by the Bill & Melinda Gates Foundation, partners with the CDC to enhance public health infrastructure in low-resource countries. The Emory University Hospital Isolation Unit and Quarantine Station was established by the CDC following the 2003 SARS outbreak. The isolation and treatment facilities at Emory University played a crucial role in ending the 2014 Ebola virus cases in the United States. CDC scientists and administrators hold memberships and frequently speak at Emory University's Vaccine Dinner Club (VDC), an association that holds monthly academic meetings to discuss and advance vaccine research. In 2015, Emory was made a member of the CDC's Prevention Epicenters Program, a research program in which CDC's Division of Healthcare Quality Promotion (DHQP) collaborates with academic investigators to conduct innovative infection control and prevention research.

In 2015, Emory University, the London School of Hygiene & Tropical Medicine, the Public Health Foundation of India, and the All India Institute of Medical Sciences established the Center for Control of Chronic Conditions in New Delhi, India. The center aims to improve the prevention and care of diabetes, heart disease, cancer, mental health, and injuries in India.

The International Association of National Public Health Institutes is based at the university. The association was chartered in 2006 with a $20 million, five-year grant through Emory University from the Bill and Melinda Gates Foundation. In 2015, the Emory Global Health Institute and Centers for Disease Control and Prevention were made lead partners for the newly created, $75 million Bill and Melinda Gates Foundation-funded Child Health and Mortality Prevention Surveillance Network (CHAMPS).

Emory University research is heavily funded by the United States Department of Health and Human Services's National Institutes of Health. The federal agency awarded the university nearly $600 million in the fiscal year of 2021. In 2015, Emory University was one of four institutions selected by the National Institute of Allergy and Infectious Diseases for its seven-year, multimillion-dollar Tuberculosis Research Units (TBRU) program, which aims to drive innovation in tuberculosis research and reduce the global burden of the disease. In 2015, an Emory-led research consortium received a five-year, $15 million grant from the National Institutes of Health (NIH) to research human immune responses to Varicella zoster virus and pneumococcal vaccination. The university also received a $9 million grant over five years from the NIH to support one of three national Centers for Collaborative Research in Fragile X syndrome. The grant is a renewal of Emory's National Fragile X Research Center, continuously funded by the NIH for more than 10 years. In 2015, the university received an $8.9 million grant over five years from the NIH National Heart, Lung, and Blood Institute (NHLBI) to better understand the role of reactive oxygen species and inflammation in blood vessel function and to explore new interventions and preventive approaches for atherosclerosis and aortic aneurysms. In 2015, the university received an $8 million grant over five years from the NIH to develop and validate mathematical models of how prior immunity affects recall immune responses to influenza viruses. The researchers will create and disseminate powerful, user-friendly modeling tools for use by the wider research community in developing more effective vaccines. In 2015, the university received a $3.6 million grant over five years from the NIH to examine the effects of maternal stress on brain function, development, and behavior in African-American infants, including the biochemical connection between the brain and the microbiome. In 2015, the university received a $3.5 million grant over five years from the NIH National Cancer Institute (NCI) for an Informatics Technology for Cancer Research award. Winship Cancer Institute and Emory School of Medicine researchers will develop software tools to help the cancer research community gain new insights from cancer imaging "big data" and develop new open-source cancer research applications. In 2015, the university received a $3.4 million grant from the NIH International Collaborations in Infectious Disease Research Program to support a partnership between the Emory Vaccine Center and the International Centre for Genetic Engineering and Biotechnology (ICGEB) in New Delhi, India to study dengue virus infection in India.

The Emory University Center for AIDS Research (CFAR) and the Emory Vaccine Center are world leaders in AIDS Vaccine Development and HIV Pathogenesis studies are funded by nine different institutes of the National Institutes of Health and by the Georgia Research Alliance. The centers include one of the largest groups of academic vaccine scientists in the world and are currently attempting to develop an effective HIV vaccine. Emory University Researchers Dr. Dennis C. Liotta, Dr. Raymond F. Schinazi and Dr. Woo-Baeg Choi discovered Emtricitabine, a nucleoside reverse transcriptase inhibitor (NRTI) used in the treatment of HIV. The drug was named as one of the world's most important antiviral drugs by the World Health Organization and is included in their Model List of Essential Medicines.

Emory is a global leader in Ebola research and treatment. The university was one of three institutions that successfully treated medical evacuees during the 2014 Ebola outbreak. In 2015, the United States Department of Health and Human Services named Emory University the lead coordinating center for the National Ebola Training and Education Center (NETEC). The university will collaborate with the University of Nebraska Medical Center, the New York City Health and Hospitals Corporation, the Centers for Disease Control and Prevention and the Office of the Assistant Secretary for Preparedness and Response on the program, which will receive $12 million in funding over the next five years. The program will support training of health care providers and facilities to manage Ebola and other emerging infectious diseases. Its objectives are to develop metrics to measure facility and health care worker readiness to care for Ebola patients, conduct assessments of state and regional Ebola Treatment Centers, create education materials related to care of patients with possible Ebola and other special pathogens and offer technical and training assistance to public health departments and health facilities. The university also received a $10.8 million grant over three years from the U.S. Department of Defense's Defense Advanced Research Projects Agency (DARPA) to lead a 10-institution national team developing improved therapeutics and vaccines for multiple strains of Ebola virus. In 2015, Emory received a three-year, $2.2 million grant from the CDC to prevent the spread of infectious diseases, including Ebola, in health-care facilities.

Emory and Georgia Tech have a strong research partnership. In 2015, Emory and Georgia Tech were awarded an $8.3 million grant by the NIH to establish a National Exposure Assessment Laboratory. The laboratory will research the impact of environmental chemicals on children's health. In 2015, the two universities received a five-year, $2.9 million grant from the National Science Foundation (NSF) to create new bachelor's, master's, and doctoral degree programs and concentrations in healthcare robotics, which will be the first program of its kind in the Southeastern United States. In 2015, Emory University, Georgia Tech, and Children's Healthcare of Atlanta were awarded a four-year, $1.8 million grant by the Cystic Fibrosis Foundation in order to expand the Atlanta Cystic Fibrosis Research and Development Program. , Emory jointly manages the second-largest cystic fibrosis population in the United States. In 2015, Emory and Georgia Tech received a $1.6 million grant from the Coulter Translational Research Partnership Program to accelerate nine promising technologies developed in research laboratories with commercialization potential.

In 2015, Emory University received a $15 million grant from the Wounded Warrior Project in order to establish the "Warrior Care Network" and develop innovative approaches to treat veterans with post-traumatic stress disorder (PTSD) and traumatic brain injury (TBI).

In 2015, Emory University and the University of South Florida received a $2.5 million grant over five years from the John E. Fogarty International Center (FIC) to study links between infectious disease transmission and agricultural practices.

Campuses

Emory University's original campus was established in Oxford, Georgia in 1836. The 56-acre campus, located 38 miles east of Emory's Atlanta Campus, is home to Oxford College of Emory University and was the site of military headquarters and infirmaries during the American Civil War. Many of the buildings were designed with Neoclassical architecture and Gothic Revival architecture. In 1975, the United States National Register of Historic Places designated the campus as part of the Oxford Historic District.

Emory's Atlanta Campus, established in the early twentieth century on a Beaux-Arts master plan by Pittsburgh architect Henry Hornbostel, covers more than 600 acres in Atlanta's historic neighborhood of Druid Hills. The university campus is heavily forested with pine, maples, oak, and magnolias, and Peavine Creek, a branch of the Peachtree Creek, runs through the campus. The Arbor Day Foundation named Emory a Tree Campus USA school in 2015. Many of the university's buildings are designed with multi-hued granite and Spanish Saltillo tile. The university has one of the largest inventories by square footage of Leadership in Energy and Environmental Design-certified building space among campuses in the United States.

The campus is home to the Emory University Hospital, Michael C. Carlos Museum, which has the largest collection of ancient artifacts in the Southeastern United States, the Winship Cancer Institute, Georgia's first and only cancer center designated by the National Cancer Institute, the Yerkes National Primate Research Center, one of eight National Institutes of Health-funded national primate research centers, and a number of other academic, art, medical, and student facilitates. In 1991, Emory opened the first collegiate LGBT student center in the Southeastern United States which is the tenth oldest in the nation. Undergraduate dormitories include the Undergraduate Residential Center, Clairmont Residential Center, Tower Apartments, Alabama Hall, Complex, Dobbs Hall, Harris Hall, Eagle Hall, Raoul Hall and Turman Hall. The Centers for Disease Control and Prevention, American Cancer Society, Children's Healthcare of Atlanta Egleston hospital, and Emory Point are located adjacent to the campus.

In 2015, a $52 million expansion and renovation project of the Sanford S. Atwood Chemistry Center was completed. The new, 270,000-square-foot complex contains laboratories, interactive teaching and study spaces, and a chemistry library. The completion of the complex was accompanied by a $1.2 million grant from the Howard Hughes Medical Institute to advance and modernize the university's chemistry curriculum.

In the Candler Library Annex of Robert W. Woodruff Library, there is a 1920s Pietro Caproni reproduction of Bertel Thorvaldsen's "The Triumph of Alexander" frieze. The frieze depicts Alexander the Great and his army entering Babylon following their victory over the Achaemenid Empire in the Battle of Gaugamela.

During the 1996 Summer Olympics in Atlanta, the university hosted the United States Olympic women's gymnastics team on its Atlanta Campus. The team, known as the Magnificent Seven, won the first-ever gold medal for the United States in the women's team all-around competition. The university housed international officials and journalists and served as a training facility for Olympians. The Cox Hall Ballroom was transformed into a news center for the Olympic foreign press.

In February 2017, Emory announced that its R. Howard Dobbs University Center, built in 1986 from a neofuturistic postmodernist design by local architect John C. Portman Jr., to house the university's main student/faculty center and dining hall (Coca-Cola Commons), would be demolished and replaced with a new $98 million Campus Life Center, designed by Durham, North Carolina-based Duda Paine Architects. Reasons given for the replacement included inconvenience of food delivery to the dining hall, undersized kitchen facilities, and inadequate fenestration in the Commons. The new state-of-the-art building, dubbed the Emory Student Center (ESC), opened in May 2019, and includes a larger dining hall, study and collaboration spaces, game room, a 1400+ person multipurpose space, coffee shop, food emporium. It is the first building on Emory's campus to receive a LEED platinum rating.

Student life

Student body
Emory University's total enrollment for fall 2021 was 15,846 students, with 8,197 undergraduates and 7,649 graduate and professional students. 21% of students are Georgia residents, the remaining come from 49 other states, D.C., American territories and more than 100 countries. 40% of students are male, 60% are female. The student to faculty ratio is 7:1, with an average class size of 25 students.

Of the 1,534 freshmen enrolled in fall 2021, 31% were Caucasian, 22% were Asian, 13% were Black/African American, 11% were Latino/Hispanic, 18% were International, 1% were Native American and 4% did not identity; 57% were female and 43% were male.

Arts
Students may engage in the performing and fine arts as an area of academic study or as extracurricular activities. Undergraduates may pursue a major in the performing arts (dance, theater, or music) or in film studies, art history, visual arts, or creative writing. Graduate programs in art history, film studies, and music are offered. There are more than 50 student organizations dedicated to the arts. Students can explore artistic interests as diverse as architecture, breakdancing, poetry, and improvisational comedy. Emory routinely hosts arts events in the Schwartz Center for Performing Arts that are open to the Emory and Atlanta communities. Recent performances include Bang on a Can All-Stars (a side project of drummer Glenn Kotche from the rock band Wilco), jazz performer Esperanza Spalding, and New York's Cedar Lake Dance Company. A program called Creativity Conversations brings artistic minds to campus to discuss art and the creative process. Guests have included Philip Glass, Jimmy Carter, Salman Rushdie, Seamus Heaney and Rita Dove. Rita Dove also gave the keynote address at Emory's 2013 Commencement.

Barkley Forum
The Barkley Forum Center for Debate Education is an intercollegiate debate organization at Emory University. The center is named in honor of Emory alumnus Alben Barkley, 35th Vice President of the United States. Debating was established at the university in 1837 and the intercollegiate debate team was formed in 1914. Emory's Barkley Forum debate team has won 3 National Debate Tournaments and over 25 individual champion speaker awards.

Community service
The university received the 2008 Presidential Award for General Community Service, which is the highest federal recognition given to higher education institutions for their commitment to community service, service-learning and civic engagement. About 25% of Emory students participate in Volunteer Emory, Emory's umbrella community service group. As one of the most popular groups on campus, Volunteer Emory offers dozens of ways to serve the community, working with varied organizations including the Atlanta Community Food Bank, Trees Atlanta, PAWS Atlanta, and Jones Boys and Girls Club. Emory Cares International Service Day brings together students, alumni and other community members to volunteer at a number of projects organized by Emory and its many partners around the city of Atlanta and in cities worldwide.

Newspaper
The Emory Wheel is the student-run newspaper of Emory University. The Wheel is published twice a week, on Tuesday and Friday, during the regular school year, and is updated regularly at its website. Serving the Emory community since 1919, the Wheel is editorially and financially independent from the university. The staff is composed entirely of students, with the exception of the general manager, who oversees advertising and whose salary is paid by the newspaper.

Programs abroad
Through the Centers of International Programs Abroad, Emory University students can study in over 40 countries at the top academic institutions in the world including the National University of Singapore, Kyoto Consortium for Japanese Studies, Nanjing University, Oxford University, Imperial College London, the School of Oriental and African Studies, Yonsei University, Trinity College Dublin, University of St. Andrews, University of Melbourne, Hertie School of Governance, University of Amsterdam, Sciences Po, University of Cape Town, and Tel Aviv University.

Greek life
Fraternities have existed on Emory's campus as early as 1840. One early chronicler makes the case that Emory's "temple" of the Mystic Seven may have been the first chapter of a national fraternity established anywhere in the South. Today, the Greek-letter sororities and fraternities play a part in leavening Emory's campus life. For undergraduates, Greek life comprises approximately 30% of the Emory student population. The Office of Greek Life recognizes and regulates on-campus chapters of fraternities and sororities. Fraternities have on-campus housing located on Eagle Row, and Sorority Village, a series of townhouses, faces the fraternity houses.

Student organizations
Hundreds of student clubs and organizations operate on Emory's campus. These include numerous student government, special interest, and service organizations. The Student Government Association charters and provides most of the funding for other student groups, and represents students' interests when dealing with the administration. The Student Government Association oversees divisional councils, each coinciding with the undergraduate, graduate and professional schools of the university. Notable among these are the College Council (CC) which handles students' concerns primarily for the undergraduate body of the Emory College of Arts and Sciences and annually sponsors the State of Race event, and the BBA Council which does similar activities for the Goizueta Business School BBA Program. The Student Programming Council is the school's primary programming organization, responsible for planning multiple events every year: Homecoming Week, Dooley's week, and a plethora of other events that happen around campus that benefit the students in a proactive way. Emory also has several secret societies—the Paladin Society, the D.V.S. Senior Honor Society, Ducemus, Speculum, and The Order of Ammon. Emory has a partnership with Coca-Cola in which they pledged 3 million dollars over a 5-year period for "Service for Learning" which projects that Emory student volunteers participate to help preserve nature trails, create urban farms, as well as restore neighborhood parks. Emory University also has many Black student organizations, including: the Black Student Alliance, the National Association for the Advancement of Colored People (NAACP), and Voices of Inner Strength Gospel Choir (VOIS).

The intramural sports program provides an athletic outlet for the entire Emory community. Emory has numerous club sports and a variety of recreational and competitive intramural teams. The Outdoor Emory Organization sponsors weekend trips of outdoor activities such as rafting, rock climbing and hiking.

Athletics
Emory ranks among top schools in both the U.S. News & World Report rankings of the best national universities and the Directors' Cup of the National Association of Collegiate Directors of Athletics (NACDA) for best all-around athletics program. Emory's 18 varsity sports teams, known as the Eagles, are members of the NCAA's Division III in the University Athletic Association (UAA). Emory has never had an intercollegiate football team.

Notable alumni and faculty

Emory University has over 13,200 faculty and staff members and over 133,000 living alumni. Awards and honors recognizing Emory alumni and faculty include the Nobel Prize, Pulitzer Prize, Presidential Medal of Freedom, Bancroft Prize, Booker Prize, Lenore Marshall Poetry Prize, National Humanities Medal, Peabody Award, Breakthrough Prize in Life Sciences, Guggenheim Fellowship, Fulbright Fellowship, American Mathematical Society Fellowship, MacArthur Fellows Program, Rhodes Scholarship, Marshall Scholarship, and membership in the American Academy of Arts and Sciences, Carnegie Foundation for the Advancement of Teaching, Howard Hughes Medical Institute, American Society for Clinical Investigation, National Academy of Sciences, and National Research Council.

Notable Alumni:
Alben Barkley (BA 1900), 35th Vice President of the United States;
Isaac Stiles Hopkins (1859C) and Robert Stewart Hyer (BA 1881, MA 1882), founding presidents of Georgia Institute of Technology and Southern Methodist University, respectively;
Young John Allen (1858C), American Methodist Missionary in the late Qing Dynasty, China;
Thomas Milton Rivers (1909C), Director of the Rockefeller Institute;
Ernest Cadman Colwell (1923C, 1927 PhD), President of the University of Chicago;
Bobby Jones (Law 1929), the only golfer to win a Grand Slam, founder of the Masters Golf Tournament, and regarded as one of the greatest golfers of all time;
Ely Callaway Jr. (1940C), Founder of the Callaway Golf Company;
Ernie Harwell (1940C), baseball broadcaster for the Detroit Tigers;
Arnall Patz (BA 1943, MD 1945),
Lee Hong-koo (1959C), 26th Prime Minister of the Republic of Korea;
Newt Gingrich (BA 1965), 58th Speaker of the House of Representatives;
Sonny Carter, NASA astronaut, Crew member of STS-33 Space Shuttle mission (1969C);
Peter Buck, guitarist for the band R.E.M.;
Kenneth Cole (BA 1976), clothing designer and founder of Kenneth Cole Productions;
Christopher McCandless (1990C), Alaskan wilderness adventurer and main subject of Jon Krakauer's Into the Wild;
Fala Chen (2005C), Chinese American Actress;
Kirsten Haglund (2013C), Miss America 2008;
Duncan L. Niederauer, chief executive officer of the New York Stock Exchange (NYSE).

Distinguished faculty: Jimmy Carter, 39th president of the United States; Sir Salman Rushdie, Booker Prize-winning novelist; Desmond Tutu, Nobel Peace Prize recipient; William Foege, tenth Centers for Disease Control and Prevention director; Nathan McCall, New York Times bestselling author; James T. Laney, 17th president of Emory University, United States ambassador to Korea from 1993 to 1997; Natasha Trethewey, Pulitzer Prize winner; and US poet laureate and Dr. Sanjay Gupta, CNN chief medical correspondent.

Notes

References

Further reading

 "Emory University", in New Georgia Encyclopedia . Retrieved July 1, 2006.
 "Emory University", in Encyclopedia of Southern Culture, ed. C. R. Wilson and William Ferris (Chapel Hill: University of North Carolina Press, 1989).
 English, Thomas H. Emory University 1915–1965: A Semicentennial History. Atlanta: Emory University, 1966.
 Gleason, Jan. "Emory ranked ninth-best national university by U.S. News & World Report magazine" in Emory Report 50, no. 1 (1997).
 Hauk, Gary S. A Legacy of Heart and Mind: Emory since 1836 (Atlanta: Emory University, developed and produced by Bookhouse Group, Inc., 1999).
 Hauk, Gary S.  Where Courageous Inquiry Leads [Atlanta; Emory University, 2010].
 Young, James Harvey. "A Brief History of Emory University", in Emory College Catalog 2003–2005 (Atlanta: Emory University Office of University Publications, 2003), 9–15.

External links

 
 Emory Athletics website

 
Educational institutions established in 1836
Universities and colleges accredited by the Southern Association of Colleges and Schools
Universities and colleges in Atlanta
Universities and colleges in DeKalb County, Georgia
Druid Hills, Georgia
1836 establishments in Georgia (U.S. state)
Universities and colleges affiliated with the Methodist Episcopal Church
Private universities and colleges in Georgia (U.S. state)